Kvinnefossen, sometimes written Kvinnafossen, is a waterfall of the river Kvinna in Sogndal Municipality in Vestland county, Norway. County Road 55 runs right past the  falls.

References

Sogndal
Waterfalls of Vestland